Placido della Marra (1560	– 2 December 1620) was a Roman Catholic prelate who served as Bishop of Melfi e Rapolla (1595–1620) and Apostolic Nuncio to the Emperor (1612–1616).

Biography
Placido della Marra was born in Naples, Italy in 1560. On 6 March 1595, he was appointed during the papacy of Pope Clement VIII as Bishop of Melfi e Rapolla. On 2 April 1595, he was consecrated bishop by Giulio Antonio Santorio, Cardinal-Priest of Santa Maria in Trastevere, with Flaminio Filonardi, Bishop of Aquino, and Leonard Abel, Titular Bishop of Sidon serving as co-consecrators. On 21 July 1612, he was appointed during the papacy of Pope Paul V as Apostolic Nuncio to the Emperor where he served until his resignation on 25 August 1616. He served as Bishop of Melfi e Rapolla until his death on 2 December 1620. While bishop, he was the principal consecrator of Melchior Klesl, Bishop of Wien, and the principal co-consecrator of Bartolomeo Cesi (cardinal), Archbishop of Conza.

References

External links and additional sources
 (for Chronology of Bishops) 
 (for Chronology of Bishops) 
 (for Chronology of Bishops) 

16th-century Italian Roman Catholic bishops
17th-century Italian Roman Catholic bishops
Bishops appointed by Pope Clement VIII
Bishops appointed by Pope Paul V
1560 births
1620 deaths
Apostolic Nuncios to the Holy Roman Empire